Duncan Paul Munro (September 25, 1896 – July 1, 1934) was a lawyer and political figure in Ontario. He represented Wellington South in the Legislative Assembly of Ontario from 1931 to 1934 as a Liberal.

He was born in Manitoba, the son of a minister in the Disciples of Christ Church, and came to Hamilton with his family. Munro moved to Guelph just before World War I. He served with the 29th Battery during the war. After the war, Munro studied at Osgoode Hall and joined a law firm in Guelph. He was elected to the assembly in a 1931 by-election held following the death of Lincoln Goldie. Munro died in office as the result of an automobile accident in the Waterdown area, while travelling from Hamilton to Toronto. He was 37.

References

External links

1934 deaths
Canadian military personnel of World War I
Ontario Liberal Party MPPs
Road incident deaths in Canada
Accidental deaths in Ontario
1896 births